A referendum on shortening school holidays was held in Cambodia on 12 January 1961. The proposed change was approved by voters.

References

Referendums in Cambodia
1961 in Cambodia
1961 referendums